RTP3 (RTP três) is a Portuguese free-to-air television channel owned and operated by state-owned public broadcaster Rádio e Televisão de Portugal (RTP). It is the company's all-news television channel, and is known for its 24-hour rolling news service and its live coverage of breaking news.

It was launched on 15 October 2001. It received other names, such as "NTV", "RTPN", and "RTP Informação" until it adopted its current name "RTP3". It is available on basic cable, satellite and terrestrial television.

History
The channel was launched on 15 October 2001 as NTV, a cable news channel headquartered in Porto. It was originally a joint-venture between PT Multimédia, Lusomundo and the television broadcaster Radiotelevisão Portuguesa (the old RTP). In 2003 it was completely acquired by the old RTP, and with the merger between the old RTP and radio broadcaster Radiodifusão Portuguesa (RDP), forming the new RTP, it became RTPN on 31 May 2004.

RTPN debuted a 24-hour schedule on 29 September 2008. Up till then, RTPN had simulcasted with Euronews during the early morning. Since mid-2009, RTPN has been available outside Portugal, through cable TV providers in Angola and Mozambique. On 19 September 2011, RTPN was renamed RTP Informação, beginning with a simulcast of Bom Dia Portugal which refreshed its graphics.

On 22 July 2015 it was announced that RTP Informação would rebrand once again. On 15 September 2015, the date of rebrand was confirmed to be 5 October, RTP's director of programmes Daniel Deusdado told the media. At midnight between 4 and 5 October 2015 Portuguese time, the channel became RTP3, during the coverage of the legislative election 2015.

Unlike the other national RTP channels, RTP3's continuity and playout is handled at the Monte da Virgem studios, near Porto.

Since 1 December 2016, the channel is available on the Portuguese digital terrestrial television.

Logos and identities

Programming
Despite being a news-based channel, occasionally RTP3 also airs some sports programming, such as the Olympics and the FIFA Confederations Cup.

News programmes

Bom Dia Portugal (6:30am-10am, simulcast with RTP1)
3 às 103 às 11
Jornal das 12
3 às 14
Zoom África
Eixo Norte Sul
3 às 16
3 às 17
18/20
Manchete 3
Online 3
360 (9pm)
24 Horas (12am, title previously used as a late bulletin on RTP1)Fareed Zakaria GPSEntertainmentLast Week Tonight with John Oliver''

References

External links
RTP news website
RTP3 programming guide, including archives of schedules dated back to 2002
RTP3 Live Stream on RTP Play, including archives of many programmes dated back to 2015

24-hour television news channels in Portugal
Television channels and stations established in 2001
Portuguese-language television stations
2001 establishments in Portugal
Rádio e Televisão de Portugal